Attila Mocsi (born 29 May 2000) is a Hungarian footballer who plays as defender for ZTE FC in Nemzeti Bajnokság I. Born in Slovakia, he is a youth international for Hungary.

International career
Mocsi was called up to the senior Hungary squad for Nations League matches against Germany (away) and Italy (home) on 23 and 26 September 2022 respectively.

References 

2000 births
Living people
Hungarian footballers
Hungary youth international footballers
Hungary under-21 international footballers
Slovak footballers
Slovak people of Hungarian descent
Association football defenders
Fehérvár FC players
Budaörsi SC footballers
Szombathelyi Haladás footballers
Zalaegerszegi TE players
Nemzeti Bajnokság I players
Nemzeti Bajnokság II players